Anne-Margrethe Björlin (1921–2006) was a Swedish film actress. She played several female leads during the 1940s, and also appeared in supporting roles. After making her last film in 1953 she became a fashion consultant. She was married to the Swedish economist Torsten Gårdlund in 1957.

Selected filmography
 The Fight Continues (1941)
 Men of the Navy (1943)
 She Thought It Was Him (1943)
 Gentleman with a Briefcase (1943)
Sin (1948)
 Bohus Battalion (1949)
 Playing Truant (1949)
 My Name Is Puck (1951)
 In the Arms of the Sea (1951)
 Unmarried Mothers (1953)

References

External links

1921 births
2006 deaths
Swedish film actresses
People from Karlshamn